WGMI (1440 AM) is a radio station broadcasting a Christian music format, licensed to Bremen, Georgia, United States.  The station is currently owned by Garner Ministries, Inc.

History
The station went on the air as WWCC (World Wide Clothing Company) in the 1960s owned by Marlin Lamar, it changed format many times, but is known to be the starting point for famous air personalities including Rhubarb Jones, Keith Jackson and current Los Angeles area personality Rick Ruhl.

It became WSLE on 1982-11-11 with a top 40 format and was changed to oldies/hits in 1985. On 1989-05-22, the station changed its call sign to WBKI, on 1993-12-06 to the current WGMI, broadcasting Christian music and programming.

Since 2006, the station has been the home of Bremen High School athletics, covering mainly football but also baseball, basketball, and wrestling, featuring Tom "The Big E" Eriquezzo.

WGMI switched to classic hits in 2010, but returned in 2012 to a Christian music format with a mix of Southern gospel and contemporary Christian and brokered religious programming on Sundays, retaining an oldies show on Saturdays.

In 2019, WGMI added the Fox sports network (including the Dan Patrick Show) during weekday daytime hours, interspersed with local sports talk shows focused on West Georgia athletics, and will carry Georgia Southern football in the fall.  Currently, Horace Garner is station manager, Jerry Segal is operations manager, and Erriquezo handles sports programming. WGMI broadcasts at 2,500 watts daytime and 62 watts at night.

References

External links

Southern Gospel radio stations in the United States
GMI